H.I.T.S. is the first greatest hits album of the New Kids on the Block (NKOTB). It includes one new song titled "If You Go Away" which peaked #16 in U.S. Billboard Hot 100. H.I.T.S. was certified Gold in Spain for the sales of 50,000 units.

Track listing

 "You Got It (The Right Stuff)" - 4:09
 "If You Go Away" - 4:00
 "Step by Step" - 4:27
 "Cover Girl" - 5:47
 "Games (The Kids Get Hard Mix)" - 5:21
 "I'll Be Loving You (Forever)" - 4:22
 "This One's for the Children" - 3:54
 "Tonight" - 3:28
 "Baby, I Believe in You" - 4:39
 "Didn't I (Blow Your Mind)" - 4:24
 "Hangin' Tough" - 4:16
 "Valentine Girl" - 3:57
 "Please Don't Go Girl" - 4:30
 "Call It What You Want (The C&C Pump-It Mix)" - 6:31
 "My Favorite Girl" - 5:28

Charts

Certifications and sales

References

1991 greatest hits albums
New Kids on the Block albums
Columbia Records compilation albums